Bolton Glacier is a glacier flowing into the head of Briand Fjord, Flandres Bay, on the west coast of Graham Land. It was mapped in 1959 by the Falkland Islands Dependencies Survey from photos taken by Hunting Aerosurveys Ltd in 1956–57, and named by the UK Antarctic Place-Names Committee for William B. Bolton (1848–89), English photographer who, with B.J. Sayce, invented the collodion emulsion process of dry-plate photography in 1864.

See also
 List of glaciers in the Antarctic
 Glaciology

References
 

Glaciers of Danco Coast